This is a list of individuals and events related to Kyrgyzstan in 2023.

Incumbents

Events

Deaths 
 3 February – Gennady Bazarov, 80, filmmaker
 9 March – Marat Sarulu, 65, film director and screenwriter

See also 

 Outline of Kyrgyzstan
 Index of Kyrgyzstan-related articles
 List of Kyrgyzstan-related topics
 History of Kyrgyzstan

References

Notes

Citations 

 
Kyrgyzstan
Kyrgyzstan
Years of the 21st century in Kyrgyzstan
2020s in Kyrgyzstan